Guy Morton, Sr. (June 1, 1893 – October 18, 1934), nicknamed "Moose", was a Major League baseball pitcher for the Cleveland Indians. Morton was born in Vernon, AL.

His best years were from 1915 to 1919, where his ERA was below 3.00 every season, and he won 10 games four times.

Morton died at the age of 41 in Sheffield, AL from a heart attack, and was buried in Vernon City Cemetery in Vernon, AL.

Fact
His son, Guy Jr., struck out in his only at bat in the Major Leagues, getting the chance with the Boston Red Sox in 1954.

See also

List of Major League Baseball single-inning strikeout leaders
List of Major League Baseball players who spent their entire career with one franchise

References

External links
Baseball-Reference.com – career statistics and analysis

1893 births
1934 deaths
Cleveland Indians players
Cleveland Naps players
Major League Baseball pitchers
Baseball players from Alabama
Waterbury Contenders players
Indianapolis Indians players
Kansas City Blues (baseball) players
Memphis Chickasaws players
Mobile Bears players
Birmingham Barons players
High Point Pointers players
People from Vernon, Alabama
People from Sheffield, Alabama